The War Is Over is a 1945 five-minute Canadian short newsreel produced by the National Film Board of Canada (NFB). The War Is Over documents the end of the Second World War. The French version of the film is titled La guerre est finie.

Synopsis 
On August 14, 1945, the United Nations at war with the Axis powers celebrated VJ Day, the day on which Japan surrendered in the Second World War. While Canadians celebrated in the streets, troops ships begin bringing back Canadian military forces, ready to come back to a peaceful and prosperous Canada.

Great mobilization of the Canadian domestic workforce in mining, agriculture and industrial sectors had led to a significant war effort. Building on its industrial prowess, and harnessing the nation's rich natural resources, Canada was about to embark on a new, brighter future of unlimited horizons.

Production
The War Is Over was  part of the NFB's series of short newsreel films that dealt with war news as well as contemporary issues in Canada. The film used the format of a compilation documentary film edited to provide a coherent story, that relied heavily on newsreel material in order to provide the background to the dialogue. Principal photography took place in less than 72 hours.

The deep baritone voice of stage actor Lorne Greene was featured in the narration of The War Is Over. Greene was known for his work on both radio broadcasts as a news announcer at CBC, as well as narrating many of the Canada Carries On series. His sonorous recitation led to his nickname, "The Voice of Canada", and to some observers, the "voice-of-God". When reading grim battle statistics, he was known as "The Voice of Doom".

Reception
The War Is Over was primarily a newsreel intended for theatrical showings and was shown on "all the screens of the country on the eve of the day of the armistice with Japan".

References

Notes

Citations

Bibliography

 Bennett, Linda Greene. My Father's Voice: The Biography of Lorne Greene. Bloomington, Indiana: iUniverse, Inc., 2004. .
 Gittings, Chris. Canadian National Cinema: Ideology, Difference and Representation. London: Routledge, 2001. .
 Lerner, Loren. Canadian Film and Video: A Bibliography and Guide to the Literature. Toronto: University of Toronto Press, 1997. .
 Rist, Peter. Guide to the Cinema(s) of Canada. Westport, Connecticut: Greenwood Publishing Group, 2001. .

External links
 The War Is Over  at NFB Collections website

1945 films
Canadian short documentary films
Canadian black-and-white films
National Film Board of Canada documentaries
1945 documentary films
Documentary films about World War II
1940s English-language films
1940s Canadian films